The Racket is a 1928 American silent crime drama film directed by Lewis Milestone and starring Thomas Meighan, Marie Prevost, Louis Wolheim, and George E. Stone. The film was produced by Howard Hughes, written by Bartlett Cormack and Tom Miranda, and was distributed by Paramount Pictures. It was adapted from Cormack's 1927 Broadway play The Racket.

Background
Due to the controversial portrayal of a corrupt police force and city government, both the film and the play were banned at the time in Chicago. The main antagonist Nick Scarsi was modeled after Al Capone while "The Old Man" was modeled after Chicago Mayor William Hale "Big Bill" Thompson.

 Plot 
Chicago Police Department officer James "Mac" McQuigg tries to keep the peace in Chicago during the Prohibition gang wars but is hampered by massive corruption. After a shootout McQuigg manages to arrest mob boss Nick Scarsi's henchman Spike Corcoran, the political boss "The Old Man" arranges to have all charges dropped. After a birthday party for Nick Scarsi's younger brother Joe Scarsi ends in a shootout in which Nick Scarsi kills Corcoran, McQuigg arrests Nick Scarsi for murder but is forced to release him after being unable to find the murder weapon.

Although McQuigg vows to bring down Nick Scarsi, he gets transferred to "the sticks" of the 28th precinct. After Joe Scarsi is arrested for a hit-and-run accident, McQuigg convinces his girlfriend Helen Hayes to implicate him. Nick Scarsi arrives and shoots the witness Patrolman Johnson, and McQuigg arrests him again for murder. When Nick Scarsi's attorney arrives with a writ of habeas corpus to free him, McQuigg rips it up and imprisons him as well. Hayes falls in love with cub reporter Dave Ames, and tricks Nick Scarsi into confessing to keep him from killing Ames. With Nick Scarsi implicated in a crime, "The Old Man" and District Attorney Welch's political machine turn on Nick Scarsi in order to remain in power at the upcoming municipal election. They trick him into attempting to escape and trying to shoot McQuigg with an empty gun before killing him themselves.

Cast
Thomas Meighan as Captain James McQuigg
Louis Wolheim as Nick Scarsi
Marie Prevost as Helen Hayes
G. Pat Collins as Patrolman Johnson (credited as Pat Collins)
Henry Sedley as Spike Corcoran
George E. Stone as Joe Scarsi (credited as George Stone)
Sam De Grasse as District Attorney Welch (credited as Sam DeGrasse)
Richard 'Skeets' Gallagher as Miller (credited as Skeets Gallagher)
Lee Moran as Pratt
John Darrow as Dave Ames - Cub Reporter

ReceptionThe Racket is one of the films nominated for the Academy Award for Best Picture (then called Outstanding Picture) in the 1929 Academy Awards.

On review aggregator website Rotten Tomatoes, the film has an approval rating of 100 percent based on 6 critics, with an average rating of 7.50 out of 10.Variety wrote "A good story, plus good direction, plus a great cast and minus dumb supervision, is responsible for another great underworld film".

Preservation
Only one copy of the film was known to exist. It was long thought lost before being located in Howard Hughes' film collection after his death. The Racket was preserved by the Academy Film Archive in 2016.

Remake
The Howard Hughes-owned RKO studios remade The Racket'' in 1951 with Robert Mitchum and Robert Ryan in the lead roles.

See also
List of rediscovered films

References

External links

Australian daybill long poster

1928 crime drama films
American black-and-white films
American crime drama films
American silent feature films
Films about organized crime in the United States
Films directed by Lewis Milestone
Films produced by Howard Hughes
Films set in Chicago
American police detective films
1920s rediscovered films
Films with screenplays by Harry Behn
Paramount Pictures films
Rediscovered American films
Films about prohibition in the United States
Films about corruption in the United States
1920s American films
Silent American drama films
Silent mystery films
Silent thriller films